McGavock Lake Water Aerodrome  is located on McGavock Lake, Manitoba, Canada.

References

Registered aerodromes in Manitoba
Seaplane bases in Manitoba